Taeniaptera lasciva is a species of stilt-legged fly in the family Micropezidae.

Subspecies
These two subspecies belong to the species Taeniaptera lasciva:
 Taeniaptera lasciva lasciva
 Taeniaptera lasciva obliterata Cresson

References

External links

 

Micropezidae
Articles created by Qbugbot
Insects described in 1798